Modern Pain is the debut album by Canadian country singer Corb Lund. Originally released in 1995, the album was re-released in 2003 after Lund's commercial breakthrough with the album Five Dollar Bill in 2002.

Track listing

 Expectation and the Blues - 2:55
 We Used to Ride 'em - 2:58
 Untitled Waltz - 3:28
 Your Game Again - 2:44
 Owlsong - 2:10
 La Souffrance des Gens - 3:11
 Lament for Lester Cousins - 3:50
 Lives of Attrition (The Best We Can Do) - 3:07
 You and Your Creeping - 4:00
 Heavy and Leaving - 3:19
 Waste and Tragedy† - 3:28
 Manyberries† - 2:41
 Evil in Me† - 2:30
 Hockey Song (live)† - 3:03
 Sixteen Tons (live)† - 2:48
 Are You Sure Hank Done It This Way (live)† - 3:25

†:Only on 2003 release

References

1995 debut albums
Corb Lund and the Hurtin' Albertans albums
Outside Music albums